English is a secondary language of Lebanon, with about 30% of the population being Anglophone. The use of English is growing in the business and media environment and is often used as a prestige language for business, diplomacy, and education.

History 
The American University of Beirut was founded in 1866, though English only overtook Arabic as the main language of instruction from 1875 onwards. Following independence from France in 1946, the use of English began to grow in Lebanon in the wake of American influence through oil and business interests in the Middle East. By 1973, 26 percent of the 75 percent of Beirut who were multilingual spoke English.

Many of the Palestinians in Lebanon were also fluent in the language.

In 1997, the Lebanese government committed to a policy of trilingualism in education, including French and English alongside the official Arabic language in the curriculum.

Social significance 
The use of English in daily life of Lebanon reflects a desire for "modernity, coolness, and hip culture". It is also a reaction to the negativity associated with Arabic since the September 11 attacks. Many businesses advertise in English. The Daily Star was an English-language newspaper.

See also
 French language in Lebanon
 Geographical distribution of English speakers

References 

Languages of Lebanon
Lebanon